Kitione Kautoga is a Fijian professional rugby league footballer who plays as a  forward for the Wests Tigers in the NRL.

He made his debut in Round 24 of the 2022 NRL season for the Tigers, debuting from the bench against the St. George Illawarra Dragons.

References

External links
Wests Tigers profile

Living people
Fijian rugby league players
Wests Tigers players
Western Suburbs Magpies NSW Cup players
Rugby league second-rows
Year of birth missing (living people)